The pericardiacophrenic artery is a long slender branch of the internal thoracic artery.

Anatomy

Origin 
The pericardiacophrenic artery branches from the internal thoracic artery.

Course 
The pericardiacophrenic arteries travel through the thoracic cavity. They course through the fibrous pericardium. The pericardiacophrenic artery accompanies the phrenic nerve between the pleura and pericardium, to the diaphragm. This is where both the artery and the phrenic nerve are distributed.

Distribution 
The pericardiacophrenic arteries provide arterial supply ot the fibrous pericardium, and (along with the musculophrenic arteries) the diaphragm.

Anastomoses 
It anastomoses with the musculophrenic, and superior phrenic arteries.

References

External links
  - "Pleural Cavities and Lungs: Structures Beneath the Left Mediastinal pleura"

Arteries of the thorax